The 2009 Shelby 427 was the third race of the 2009 NASCAR Sprint Cup season. The race was won by Kyle Busch.

The race was telecast by Fox with a radio broadcast by Performance Racing Network (terrestrial) and Sirius XM Radio (satellite).

The race title reflects the new title sponsor, Carroll Shelby International, which has its home base at LVMS, and the Shelby Cobra 427, which is made in Nevada. The race had previously been  in length, but will as of 2009 have an extra  added into the race name which equates to an addition of 18 laps, meaning that the race will now be a 285-lap duration. The race would return to 400.5 miles in 2010 and beyond.

Entry list

Qualifying 
Kyle Busch won the pole for the Shelby 427 at a new track record of 185.995 mph.  The remainder of the top 10 were Kyle's brother Kurt Busch (185.707 mph), Jimmie Johnson(185.688 mph), David Reutimann (185.624 mph), Marcos Ambrose (185.459 mph), Ryan Newman (185.395 mph), Kasey Kahne (185.382 mph), Mark Martin (185.312 mph), Kevin Harvick (185.280 mph), Tony Stewart (185.217 mph).

Full qualifying results

Pre-race
The Las Vegas Motor Speedway chaplain, Joe Freiburger gave the invocation. Jersey Boys performed the national anthem and Carroll Shelby gave the command to start engines.

Race recap
Toyota cars #00, 18 (polesitter), 47, 82, 83 were sent to the back of the field because of engine changes.

Kurt Busch and Jimmie Johnson led the field to the green flag. Johnson led the first lap; Brad Keselowski hit the wall out of turn 4 causing a flat tire and the first caution of the day. Matt Kenseth reported engine trouble, came onto pit road where his crew fixed the problem, but Kenseth was too fast exiting pit road. Kenseth was served the penalty of restarting from the tail end of the field.

Restart on lap 6 with Johnson, Ku. Busch, Harvick, Newman, and Stremme in the Top 5. Daytona 500 winner and point leader Kenseth's engine blew on the front stretch on lap 7 while Todd Bodine spun out of turn 2 after a slight contact from behind by Hamlin. Second caution of the day. Keselowski got the luck dog free pass.

Restart on lap 11. No change in positions in the Top 5. As of lap 19, Carl Edwards was in 9th from starting 16th, Montoya was running in 8th from the 23rd starting position, and Kyle Busch was in 30th after starting from the back. Johnson continued to lead laps since the first lap. Brad Keselowski drove his car to the garage on lap 36. Within 50 laps since the start of the race, Jamie McMurray gained 19 positions, Gordon and Reutimann moved up 16 positions, Biffle gained 15 positions, and Vickers gained 14 positions. Green flag pit stops ensued on lap 48. Earnhardt, Jr. was served a pass through penalty for being too fast exiting pit road. Regan Smith and Casey Mears were also served the pass through penalty for entering too fast on pit road. Edwards and Kyle Busch each led two laps and Logano led a lap during the green flag pit stops.

Caution would come out on lap 60 for debris on the track. Newman won the lucky dog free pass. Kahne, Waltrip, Hamlin and others entered pit road during the caution.  John Andretti, David Gilliland, Scott Speed, Clint Bowyer, Earnhardt, Jr., Regan Smith, Todd Bodine, A.J. Allmendinger, Robby Gordon, Martin Truex, Jr., and Elliott Sadler were a lap down when the caution flag was waved.

Restart on lap 65 with Johnson, Edwards, Kurt Busch, Harvick and Biffle in the top five. McMurray, running in 13th, was hit from behind by Logano and slid out of turn 2, but maintained control. No caution. McMurray dropped to 26th as a result. Lap 74, Regan Smith came on pit road with engine troubles. Fourth caution of the day. Clint Bowyer got the free pass. During the round of pit stops, Harvick, Stewart, and Montoya gain four positions, Gordon and Hamlin gain five spots, Mark Martin gain two spots, Kurt Busch lost four spots, Jeff Burton and Kyle Busch gained six positions and Johnson, taking four tires, lost nine spots.

Restart on lap 83 with Harvick, Stewart, Biffle, Jeff Gordon, Mark Martin, Kurt Busch, Burton, Montoya, Hamlin, and Johnson in the top ten. In two laps, Biffle took in the lead from Harvick. Lap 90, Jeff Gordon took second place from Harvick. Brad Keweloski returned to the track 57 laps down in the 42nd position. Lap 95, Edwards made contact to Stremme's left rear quarter panel, sending Stremme spinning out of turn 2. Fifth caution of the race. Earnhardt, Jr. got the free pass. Harvick lost two spots, Burton gain three positions, Amirola gained fourteen spots, and Bowyer gained eight spots during the round of pit stops. Biffle and former teammate Mark Martin stayed on the track.

Restart on lap 100 with Biffle, Mart Martin, Jeff Gordon, Kurt Bush, and Johnson in the top five. Bowyer and Montoya, running in 14th, made contact entering turn 1. No caution. Montoya entered pit road and exited in the 27th position. Lap 122, Mark Martin, running in 4th, blew the engine bring the sixth caution. Martin Truex, Jr. got the free pass. During the pitstop round, Jonson and McMurray gained two spots and Biffle and Stewart lost two positions. Kasey Kahne stayed out to lead a lap before entering pit road.

Johnson, Jeff Gordon, Biffle, McMurray, Burton, Stewart, Harvick, Kyle Busch, Hamlin, and Hornish, Jr. were in the top ten during the restart on lap 131. Seventh caution on lap 138 when Reed Sorenson lost control exiting turn 2 and hit the outside wall of the backstretch; Robby Gordon got the lucky dog free pass. Hornish, Jr. entered pit road from the 10th position. The field restarted on lap 143 with Johnson as the leader. Amirola hit the outside wall in turn 3 then slowed on the backstretch where Kasey Kahne tried to avoid hitting Amirola's car. Kahne slid off the track, making slight contact with Amirola. Menard, Bobby Labonte, and Robby Gordon, from the end of the lead lap, made pit stops.

Restart on lap 149 with Johnson, Jeff Gordon, Biffle, Stewart, and Kyle Busch in the top five. Jeff Gordon took the lead away from Johnson in two laps. On lap 160, Jeff Gordon let his 20,000th Sprint Cup lap, (7th all-time record). Lap 164, Waltrip, running in the 20th position, lost control in turn 4, hit the outside wall. Eighth caution; David Gilliland got the free pass. During the round of pitstops, Burton gained seven spots, Bobby Labonte moved up twelve spots, Vickers moved up thirteen spots, Martin Truex, Jr. gained fourteen spots, Biffle lost two, and Jeff Gordon and Jimmie Johnson both lost five spots.

Restart on lap 169 with Burton, Bobby Labonte, Vickers, Truex, Jr., Biffle, Jeff Gordon, Johnson, Kyle Busch, Stewart, and Edwards in the top ten. One lap later, Hamlin, running in 13th, lost control between turn 3 and 4, sliding across the outside wall, bring out the tenth caution. John Andretti got the free pass. The field restarted on lap 175 with Burton in the lead. Jimmie Johnson took second from Bobby Labonte on lap 187.

Eleventh caution on lap 220, Jeff Gordon missed the entrance to pit road and blew his left front tire causing damage during green flag pitstops. Edwards beat Labonte off pit road for the second position, but Edwards' crew missed placing a lugnut. Burton maintains the lead off pit road. Jimmie Johnson slid on then past his pitbox. Dave Gilliland got the free pass for the second time. The field restarted on lap 228 with Burton, Labonte, Kyle Busch, Vickers, and Ruetimann in the top five. Kyle Busch, the pole winner, took the lead from Burton in less than one lap.

Twelfth caution for debris (new race record) on lap 259. Sam Hornish, Jr. got the free pass. Clint Bowyer stayed on the track as the field entered pit road: Burton moved up five spots, Jeff Gordon gained seven spots, Kyle Busch lost two positions, and Labonte and Vickers both lost four positions. Labonte and Johnson nearly collided as Labonte was leaving his pit box and Johnson was entering his.

Restart on lap 264 with Bowyer, Burton, Jeff Gordon, Kyle Busch, Reutimann, Edwards, Labonte, Vickers, Kahne, and McMurray in the top ten. In two laps, Kyle Busch was in third behind Bowyer and Burton. Lap 267, Kyle Busch took second from Burton out of turn 2. In the next lap, Kyle Busch took the lead from Bowyer out of turn 2. Caution for the thirteenth time on lap 269 after Menard, racing between Amborise and Logano, lost control and hit the outside wall out of turn 4. Harvick got the free pass. From the end of the lead lap, Earnhardt, Jr., Robby Gordon, Hornish, Jr. and Gilliland made pitstops.

The field restarted on lap 278 with Kyle Busch, Burton, Bowyer, Reutimann, Jeff Gordon, Edwards, Labonte, Vickers, McMurray and Jimmie Johnson in the top ten. Caution a lap later; Jimmie Johnson, running in 10th, lost control in turn 2 and hit the outside wall, damaging the front right and back right end. Restart on lap 282 with Kyle Busch as the leader. Two laps to go, Bowyer passed teammate Burton for second as Edwards's engine blew. Edwards managed to keep his car away the field; no caution. Kyle Busch, who started from the back from pole position, took the checkered flag for the first time in the season.

Clint Bowyer finished second ahead of Richard Childress Racing teammate Jeff Burton. David Reutimann was in fourth, his first career top 5 finish in the Cup series. Bobby Labonte, in fifth, had the highest-finishing Ford. Jamie McMurray finish in 9th after starting the race in 38th. Kasey Kahne had the best finished Dodge in 11th. Rookies Joey Logano and Scott Speed were in 13th and 21st respectively. Jimmie Johnson, leading the most laps (92), finished in 24th. Stewart Haas Motorsports drivers Ryan Newman and Tony Stewart finished in 25th and 26th respectively. Daytona 500 winner Matt Kenseth finished in 43rd behind of teammate David Regan because of engine problems.

Race results

Post race notes 
Jeff Gordon surpassed 20,000 career laps led during the middle of the race, and is 6th surpassing Rusty Wallace.

Point standings
Jeff Burton moved from 31st to 18th in the standings. Kyle Busch and Bobby Labonte gained twelve spots from the 18th position and the 22nd position respectively. Kasey Kahne moved from 23rd to 13th. Brian Vickers, from 26th in the standings, was in 17th after the race. David Reutimann and David Gilliland both gained seven spots from the 12th and 44th in the standings respectively. Jaime McMurray and Dale Earnhardt, Jr. gained six spots from 28th and 35th respectively. Gaining five pointings, Kevin Harvick was in 11th, Joey Logano in 32nd, Regan Smith in 35th, and Scott Speed in 36th. Clint Bowyer was in second behind Jeff Gordon from the 6th position in the standings.

David Ragan lost sixteen spots from the eighth position to 24th. Reed Sorenson dropped to 25th from the 14th position. Martin Truex, Jr. lost nine positions from 17th in the standings. A.J. Allmendinger went from 13th to 21st in the standings. Casey Mears and Mark Martin lost seven spots from the 20th and 27th position respectively. Losing five positions in the standings, Michael Waltrip was in 12th from 7th, Juan Pablo Montoya in 15th from 10th, Elliott Salder in 16th from 11th, and John Andretti was in 30th from 25th. Kurt Busch and Tony Stewart both lost four positions from the 3rd and 4th position respectively. Daytona 500 winner Matt Kenseth dropped to 3rd from 1st in the standings.

References 

Shelby 427
Shelby 427
NASCAR races at Las Vegas Motor Speedway
March 2009 sports events in the United States